Halolaguna discoidea is a moth in the family Lecithoceridae. It is found in China (Chongqing, Guangxi, Sichuan).

The wingspan is 16.5–18 mm. The ground colour of the forewings is deep greyish brown with a yellowish white subapical spot. The discal and discocellular spots are blackish brown and there is a yellowish white line extending from the costal 2/5 to above the fold, edged with blackish brown scales along the inner margin. The hindwings are greyish brown, but yellowish white basally.

Etymology
The species name refers to the discal process of the aedeagus at the apex and is derived from Latin discoideus (meaning discal).

References

Moths described in 2014
Halolaguna